Markvartovice is a municipality and village in Opava District in the Moravian-Silesian Region of the Czech Republic. It has about 2,200 inhabitants. It is part of the historic Hlučín Region.

History

The first written mention of Markvartovice is from 1377, when it was owned by Rosat, a forester of the Opava princes. Until 1551, the village was a seat of the Bzenec knights. Then the village often changed owners until 1673, when it became the property of the Jesuits from Opava. Their reckless reign led to an uprising of the inhabintants in 1734. From 1742 the village belonged to Prussia after Maria Theresa had been defeated.

Sights
The most significant monument of the municipality is the early Baroque Chapel of the Holy Trinity from the second half of the 17th century.

Notable people
Jaromír Bohačík (born 1992), basketball player; raised here and lives here

References

External links

 

Villages in Opava District
Hlučín Region